Dizmas is the third studio album by Christian rock band Dizmas. The self-titled album is a collection of some of the band's most popular songs, plus four new songs titled "Yours," "Save the Day," "Different," and "Worth Fighting For". The album was released on April 29, 2008 under Forefront Records.

Track listing
"Yours"
"Play It Safe"
"Save the Day"
"Redemption, Passion, Glory"
"Different"
"Shake It Off"
"Jealousy Hurts"
"This Is A Warning"
"Worth Fighting For"
"Dance"

Personnel
 Matthew Everhart – lead vocals
 Brandon Neidhart – guitar, backing vocals
 Jeremy Barnhart - guitar
 Austin Warth - drums
 Jason Timmons - bass

References

Sources
www.jesusfreakhideout.com 

Dizmas albums
2008 albums
ForeFront Records albums